CHML is a radio station, broadcasting at 900 AM in Hamilton, Ontario, Canada. CHML's transmitter power is 50,000 watts using an eight-tower directional antenna array with a signal oriented largely west-northwest to east-southeast, covering the Niagara Peninsula and Western New York, USA strongest; the array is located between Peter's Corners and Cambridge. Its studios are located on West Main Street (next to Highway 403) in Hamilton. The station airs a news/talk format branded as Global News Radio 900 CHML. CHML is owned by Corus Entertainment.

History 
CHML began operations in 1927 as a response to censorship of political discussions by Hamilton's first radio station, CKOC. The original owner was Maple Leaf Radio Company, operated by George H. Lees, a former mayor of Hamilton. The "HML" in the call-sign stood for "Hamilton Maple Leaf". CHML made its debut on Wednesday September 28, 1927. In those early years, CHML operated at 341 meters (880 kHz). In early December 1934, George Lees sold the station to Senator Arthur Hardy.  At that time, CHML was operating with only 50 watts of power, and the new owner hoped to increase it to 100 watts. In 1936, Hardy asked local broadcaster Ken Soble to become the station's manager. By 1944, Soble was able to purchase the station. Shortly after Soble's death in 1966, his estate sold the station to Western Broadcasting, later known as Western International Communications. Corus took over Western's radio assets in late 1999; this included twelve radio stations, among which was CHML.

On November 27, 2017, CHML rebranded as Global News Radio 900 CHML.

Programming 
CHML's 1927 debut broadcast was typical of its era. Hamilton's mayor gave a brief talk, and then a series of local artists performed live from the new station's studios; the evening's master of ceremonies was tenor Fred Trestrail, who had become well known as a vocalist on CFRB in Toronto.  Throughout CHML's early years, the station's programming was a combination of music, news, sports and stock market reports, and religious sermons from area clergy. The music was provided by local performers: one frequent guest was contralto Olive Barlow, and other guest entertainers came from the Tivoli Theatre in downtown Hamilton.
The station was an affiliate of CBC Radio's Dominion Network from 1944 until the network dissolved in 1962.

Throughout the years, CHML became well known for local programs, such as live broadcasts of the Hamilton City Council, Ken Soble's Amateur Hour, and the return to radio of veteran broadcaster Jane Gray in the early 1950s. Also popular was Bill Hartnoll, the "Old Garden Doctor" who broadcast advice about gardening for nearly twenty years, during the 1970s and 1980s.
CHML was also the voice of the Hamilton Tiger-Cats, broadcasting football from 1950 to 1977, and then again from 1984 to 2015. One of CHML's best-known sportscasters was Norm Marshall, who began doing play-by-play on radio in the mid-1940s, and later expanded his role to cover sports on local television station CHCH-TV; he also did some work for the CBC. He was known as the voice of the Hamilton Tiger-Cats for 26 years. In 2015, Marshall was posthumously inducted into the Hamilton Sports Hall of Fame.

While CHML has an all-talk format today, it did not begin broadcasting daily talk shows till the early 1950s. The station debuted its first talk radio program, a morning call-in show known as "Open Line," in 1954.  One announcer who became known for hosting it was Perc Allen, who became the host of "Open Line" in 1959.  Allen, who also wrote and broadcast editorials about current issues, later became a news and traffic reporter, and spent several decades as a sportscaster for CHML.

Over the decades, CHML has had a number of well-known announcers. Paul Hanover was a popular morning show host during the late 1940s through the early 1980s. He spent a total of 37 years on air at CHML, before being suddenly reassigned to an off-air position as Director of Public Relations in 1982.  His sign-on was "Hi y'all, this is Paul," and in addition to his morning show, he also broadcast some sports events.  He was affectionately referred to as the "Mayor of the Morning."  Perhaps the first black announcer at CHML was blues and folk singer Jackie Washington; born and raised in Hamilton, Washington had his own program from 1948 to 1950.

One of the best-known announcers in recent years is Bob Bratina. He had formerly worked in radio in Toronto, and subsequently spent a total of 20 years at CHML, doing a popular morning show called the "Brat Pack." His career at CHML began in the late 1980s. In addition to hosting the morning show, he also became the play-by-play announcer for the Hamilton Tiger-Cats. He left CHML in 1996 and worked at other stations for several years, before returning to CHML in 1999. He remained the morning show host until 2004, when he briefly left to run for political office. Although he won and became a city councilor, he continued with his morning show on CHML. He ultimately gave up his morning show to run for mayor of Hamilton in 2010.

Among other popular announcers on CHML was Tom Cherington, who was an evening talk show host in the 1960s and 1970s. He hosted a program called "Action Line."  He was also praised by radio critics for his skill as a news-reader. Also popular was John Hardy, a veteran talk show host who spent 22 years at CHML; when Bob Bratina was not working for the station, Hardy did the morning show; prior to that, he was on the air in the afternoon drive shift. When Bratina was re-hired in 1999, Hardy was unexpectedly fired, and Bratina took over the morning show again.

For many years, Hamilton Tiger-Cats and McMaster Marauders Canadian football games were heard on CHML, as were the Hamilton Bulldogs; the relationship between CHML and the Tiger-Cats was particularly long, as CHML had been the flagship station for the team from the year of merger of the Tigers and Wildcats in 1950 until 2014. By 2016, CHML had lost all of its sports rights to CKOC. CHML continues to air its long-running Tiger-Cats postgame show, The 5th Quarter, as an unofficial production; it also joined the Buffalo Bills Radio Network in 2016. CHML regained the rights to the Tiger-Cats in 2021 after CKOC ended its sports programming.

CHML airs old time radio programs from the 1940s and 1950s nightly, as well as weekends. These shows feature classic NBC and CBS programs. National news is provided by the Canadian Press's radio service.

References

External links 
 Global News Radio 900 CHML
 
 Radio-Locator information on CHML

Hml
Hml
Hml
Radio stations established in 1927
1927 establishments in Ontario
HD Radio stations
HML
Ham